Luca Falbo (born 21 February 2000) is an Italian professional footballer who plays as a leftback for  club Monopoli.

Professional career
On 1 July 2017, Falbo joined the youth academy of Lazio from Roma. Falbo made his professional debut with Lazio in a 2–0 UEFA Europa League loss to Rennes on 12 December 2019. He made his Serie A debut for Lazio on 20 July 2020 as an 89th-minute substitute for Luiz Felipe in a 1–2 away loss to Juventus.

On 2 October 2020 he joined Serie C club Viterbese on loan.

On 25 July 2022, Falbo moved to Monopoli on a one-season deal.

References

External links
 
 

2000 births
Living people
People from Chivasso
Italian footballers
Association football fullbacks
S.S. Lazio players
U.S. Viterbese 1908 players
S.S. Monopoli 1966 players
Serie A players
Serie C players
Footballers from Piedmont
Sportspeople from the Metropolitan City of Turin